The 2016 Hampton Downs 101 was an endurance race staged at the Hampton Downs Motorsport Park,  in North Waikato, New Zealand on 27 October. It was the first running of the Hampton Downs 101 and served as the penultimate round of the 2016 Australian GT Championship.

The race was won by Roger Lago and David Russell, driving the JBS Australia Lamborghini Gallardo R-EX.

Official results

References

Hampton Downs 101
Auto racing series in New Zealand
Hampton Downs
Sport in Waikato